Peter Korsch is an East German sprint canoer who competed in the early 1970s. He won a bronze medal in the K-4 1000 m event at the 1973 ICF Canoe Sprint World Championships in Tampere.

References

German male canoeists
Living people
Year of birth missing (living people)
ICF Canoe Sprint World Championships medalists in kayak